Smile, Brother, Smile is a 1927 American comedy film directed by John Francis Dillon, and written by Dwinelle Benthall, Rufus McCosh and Rex Taylor. The film stars Jack Mulhall, Dorothy Mackaill, Philo McCullough, E. J. Ratcliffe, Harry Dunkinson and Ernest Hilliard. The film was released on September 11, 1927, by First National Pictures.

Cast      
Jack Mulhall as Jack Lowery
Dorothy Mackaill as Mildred Marvin
Philo McCullough as Harvey Renrod
E. J. Ratcliffe as Fred Bowers
Harry Dunkinson as Mr. Potter
Ernest Hilliard as Mr. Saunders
Charles Clary as Mr. Market
John Francis Dillon as Mr. Kline 
Yola d'Avril as Daisy
Hank Mann as The Collector
T. Roy Barnes as High-powered Salesman
Jed Prouty as High-powered Salesman
Sammy Blum as High-powered Salesman

References

External links
 

1927 films
1920s English-language films
Silent American comedy films
1927 comedy films
First National Pictures films
Films directed by John Francis Dillon
American silent feature films
American black-and-white films
1920s American films